Promegistidae is a family of mites in the order Mesostigmata.

Species
Promegistidae contains one genus, with one recognized species:

 Genus Promegistus Womersley, 1958
 Promegistus armstrongi Womersley, 1958

References

Mesostigmata
Acari families
Monogeneric arthropod families